Gmina Bierawa, German Gemeinde Birawa is a rural gmina (administrative district) in Kędzierzyn-Koźle County, Opole Voivodeship, in south-western Poland.

Since 2007 the commune, like much of the area, is officially bilingual in German and Polish.

Administrative divisions
The commune contains the villages and settlements of:

Bierawa
Brzeźce
Dziergowice
Goszyce
Grabówka
Korzonek
Kotlarnia
Lubieszów
Ortowice
Solarnia
Stara Kuźnia
Stare Koźle

Neighbouring gminas
Gmina Bierawa is bordered by the gminas of Kuźnia Raciborska, Rudziniec, Sośnicowice and Toszek.

Twin towns – sister cities

Gmina Bierawa is twinned with:
 Ostfildern, Germany

Gallery

References

Bierawa
Kędzierzyn-Koźle County
Bilingual communes in Poland